Honkyoku (本曲, "original pieces") are the pieces of shakuhachi music collected in the 18th century by a Komuso of the Japanese Fuke sect Kinko Kurosawa. It was believed that these pieces were played by the members of the Fuke Sect. The Fuke sect was a Japanese sect of masterless samurai (Ronins) self called komusō  "Lay Monks of the Non-Dual & None-ness". According to Japanologist Torsten Olafsson "Having become masterless samurai in a time of peace and having had to join the growing groups of flute-playing beggars to survive, like the komosō:, those rōnin did no longer enjoyed the privileges and relative security of belonging to any ordinary families, or households, that could be inspected, approved, and registered every year under the new "Danka System", as a result in 1640 they organized themselves as sincere members of some kind of a "new" native Buddhist movement that played the shakuhachi."  

It is believed that after the crushing of the revolt of ronins around Shimabara the Tokugawa Bakufu ordered the tracking down and punishment of all remaining Catholic Christian believers left hiding in the country, even taking their life if they did not reject and renounce their alien faith. Komuso needed to have their religious movement linked to Zen Buddhism on an official way to survive the new all sects inspection bureau.  For that reason Komuso faked documents linking them to 9th century Fuke Zenji to be recognized by the all sects inspection bureau as a legitimate Buddhist sect   in order to achieve respectful acceptance, independence and possible secure legal privileges. Komuso were not zen Buddhist monks and there does not exist any documentary evidence of any solid "affiliation" between the socalled "Fuke Sect" and the Edo Period Rinzai Zen Institution,  therefore Honkyoku are not original pieces of Zen Buddhist music composed or performed by Buddhist Zen Monks in a state of enlightenment but rather were pieces composed by ronins (former samurais) self-called komuso who had a sincere fondness for Zen Buddhism.  There is also no evidence that Komusō played honkyoku for enlightenment and alms as early as the 13th century as komuso first appeared in 1640.  Komuso are different from the earlier Fuke Komoso of the early 1600s.  In fact it was very well demonstrated by japanologists Deeg   and Torsten Olafsson that the Kyotaku Denki was a cover story invented by one or more mid-17th century early komusō ideologists and storytellers. . The Fuke sect which originated from this practice ceased to exist in the 19th century, after which several shakuhachi guilds were formed, and the verbal and written lineage of many honkyoku continues today, though the music is now often practised in a concert or performance setting.  Since 1950 Honkyoku is part of the practice of suizen (吹禅, "blowing Zen"). It was in1950 when for first time the term "suizen" was conceived as "Sui-teki shugyo" by the 32nd Kyōto Myōan-ji 'Kansu', 看首, "supervisor", "director", Rodō Genkyō.  The above knowledge is highly controversial and contested among Japanese scholars such as Kiku Day, who maintain that according to the iconography and art coming out of Japan during the Edo period, it is very likely that the Fuke sect existed during this time.

There are many ryū 流, or schools, of honkyoku, each with their own style, emphasis, and teaching methods.

"Motion in honkyoku is significantly static, precisely because of the dominance of the sacred purpose and function, and to a certain extent, it is also subject to breathing meditation, the principle of the suidan - the phrase of one full breath - thus a form of breathing exercise."

Kinko Ryū 

In the 18th century, a komusō named Kinko Kurosawa of the Fuke sect  was commissioned to travel Japan and collect these musical pieces.  Although it is commonly thought that the 36 pieces of the Kinko Ryū Honkyoku repertoire were collected and played by Kinko Kurosawa, these pieces were significantly changed and codified by later generations, including Miura Kindo and others.

 Hifumi—Hachigaeshi no Shirabe 一二三鉢返の調
 Taki-ochi no Kyoku (Taki-otoshi no Kyoku) 瀧落の曲
 Akita Sugagaki 秋田菅垣
 Koro Sugagaki 転菅垣
 Kyūshū Reibo 九州鈴慕
 Shizu no Kyoku 志図の曲
 Kyō Reibo 京鈴慕
 Mukaiji Reibo 霧海箎
 Kokū Reibo  虚空
 a)  Kokū Kaete (Ikkan-ryū) 虚空替手 (一関流) b) Banshikichō 盤渉調
 Shin Kyorei 真虚霊
 Kinsan Kyorei 琴三虚霊
 Yoshiya Reibo 吉野鈴慕
 Yūgure no Kyoku 夕暮の曲
 Sakai Jishi 栄獅子
 Uchikae Kyorei 打替虚霊
 Igusa Reibo 葦草鈴慕
 Izu Reibo 伊豆鈴慕
 Reibo Nagashi 鈴慕流
 Sōkaku Reibo 巣鶴鈴慕
 Sanya Sugagaki 三谷菅垣
 Shimotsuke Kyorei 下野虚霊
 Meguro-jishi 目黒獅子
 Ginryū Kokū 吟龍虚空
 Sayama Sugagaki 佐山菅垣
 Sagari Ha no Kyoku 下り葉の曲
 Namima Reibo 波間鈴慕
 Shika no Tōne 鹿の遠音
 Hōshōsu 鳳将雛
 Akebono no Shirabe 曙の調
 Akebono Sugagaki 曙菅垣
 Ashi no Shirabe 芦の調
 Kotoji no Kyoku 琴柱の曲
 Kinuta Sugomori 砧巣籠
 Tsuki no Kyoku 月の曲
 Kotobuki no Shirabe 寿の調

At least three additional pieces were later added to the Kinko-Ryu repertoire:

 Kumoi Jishi 雲井獅子
 Azuma no Kyoku 吾妻の曲
 Sugagaki  菅垣

Other notable Honkyoku schools:

Notes
 Shakuhachi Meditation Music, a 1997 CD release from Sounds True, features 13 selections from the Kinko Ryū, performed by Stan Richardson.

References

External links
 Kinko Ryū information
 Kinko Ryū repertoire
 Dokyoku repertoire
 The Systemisation of the Musical Language of the Fukezen Shakuhachi Honkyoku
 The "Ascetic Shakuhachi" Historical Evidence Research Web Pages 
 KomusØ and "Shakuhachi-Zen" From Historical Legitimation to the Spiritualisation of a Buddhist denomination in the Edo Period 

Buddhist music
Zen art and culture
Japanese styles of music
Japanese traditional music